The Centralia micropolitan area may refer to:

The Centralia, Illinois micropolitan area, United States
The Centralia, Washington micropolitan area, United States

See also
Centralia (disambiguation)